Southport Football Club may refer to:

 Southport Australian Football Club (Southport Sharks), (Queensland State League). Gold Coast, Queensland
 Southport F.C., from Southport, England